György Csányi (7 March 1922 – 13 December 1978) was a Hungarian athlete who mainly competed in the 100 metres.

He competed for Hungary at the 1952 Summer Olympics held in Helsinki, Finland where he won the bronze medal in the men's 4 x 100 metre relay with his team mates László Zarándi, Géza Varasdi and Béla Goldoványi.

Competition record

References

1922 births
1978 deaths
Hungarian male sprinters
Olympic bronze medalists for Hungary
Athletes (track and field) at the 1948 Summer Olympics
Athletes (track and field) at the 1952 Summer Olympics
Athletes (track and field) at the 1956 Summer Olympics
Olympic athletes of Hungary
European Athletics Championships medalists
Medalists at the 1952 Summer Olympics
Olympic bronze medalists in athletics (track and field)